This is an incomplete list of by-elections to the National Assembly of France.  It includes all by-elections (French: élection partielles) to the National Assembly between 2002 and 2020.

List

11th legislature (1997–2002)

12th legislature (2002–2007)

13th legislature (2007–2012)

14th legislature (2012–2017)

15th legislature (2017–2022)

References

External links 
Results of past legislative by-elections from the Ministry of the Interior 

France